György Katona (born 16 April 1960) is a former Hungarian professional footballer who played as a left winger. He was a member of the Hungarian national football team.

Career 
He started playing football for Dunakeszi VSE. After that he played for the III. Kerületi TVE and then for the Volán FC. During his military service he played football for H. Rákóczi SE. Between 1983 and 1985 he played for Vasas SC, from 1985 to 1986 for Volán FC. From 1986 to 1990 he played for Újpest FC, where he was a member of the 1987 Hungarian Cup winning team.

In 1990 he was a member of the team that won the championship. In 1990 he signed for the Finnish team FC Haka.

National team 
Between 1988 and 1990, he played twice for the national team.

Honours 

 Nemzeti Bajnokság I (NB I)
 Champion: 1990
 Magyar Kupa (MNK)
 Winner: 1987

References 

Hungarian footballers
1960 births
Living people
Hungary international footballers
Footballers from Budapest
Association football wingers
Volán FC players
Vasas SC players
Újpest FC players
FC Haka players
Nemzeti Bajnokság I players
Veikkausliiga players
Hungarian expatriate footballers
Hungarian expatriate sportspeople in Finland
Expatriate footballers in Finland